"No One Hurts Me More Than Me" is a song recorded by Canadian country music artist Chris Cummings. It was released in 2000 as the second single from his second studio album, Lonesomeville. It peaked at number 7 on the RPM Country Tracks chart in August 2000.

Chart performance

References

2000 songs
2000 singles
Chris Cummings songs
Warner Music Group singles
Song recordings produced by Jim Ed Norman
Songs written by Chris Cummings